Functional Skills are qualifications that have been developed by the UK Government as part of an initiative to improve England’s literacy, numeracy and ICT skills.  They are replacing Key Skills Level 1 and 2 qualifications from September 2012; in the short-term Entry Level Key Skills will remain as there is no current replacement – this is still in review.

Functional skills qualifications are now integral in:

 GCSEs – in English, mathematics and ICT and are included in key stage 3 and key stage 4 programmes of study.
 Diplomas
 A component in all apprenticeship frameworks – Key Skills will be still be available for registration until 31 August 2012.
Functional Skills are also available as stand-alone qualifications.

A three-year Functional Skills pilot ended on 31 August 2010. All pilot qualifications have been withdrawn and the new accredited functional skills qualifications are now available for all learners.

Although several assessment models were piloted, the QCDA have approved assessment models that consist of internal assessment and moderation of entry level qualifications by the centre.  Level 1 and Level 2 assessments are to be externally assessed and moderated, and carried out in exam conditions at the centre.  Functional Skills English Speaking and Listening components will be internally assessed but externally moderated.  In Functional Skills Mathematics assessments, candidates at all levels are allowed the use of a calculator.  Functional Skills ICT assessments will require use of a computer with internet access.

Although the delivery of Functional Skills should be embedded into all curricula by using contextualised teaching materials, the assessments at Level 1 and level 2 will be neither embedded nor contextualised and will be graded as PASS/FAIL via a test.  The English speaking and listening skills requires internal assessment of  English usage; all other skills are externally assessed.  There are no proxies and no portfolio requirements for these qualifications - therefore unless the qualification has been achieved previously, there is no direct replacement.

Functional Skills Mathematics assessments will consist of mathematical problem solving and decision making using numbers, with tasks simulating the natural occurrence of numerical reasoning within real life contexts.

Functional Skills English assessments will consist of speaking and listening, reading and writing tasks simulating the need for English language skills within real life contexts; including usage of spelling and grammar and presentation skills.

Functional Skills ICT assessments will consist of tasks demanding independent use of all forms of ICT; problem solving, research and interpretation.

Functional Skills are only available in England – Scotland has an alternative skills programme – Core Skills and Wales – Essential Skills.

References 

 http://www.edexcel.com/quals/func-skills/delivering/Pages/default.aspx
 http://feweek.co.uk/2012/02/24/promoting-the-positive-in-functional-skills/
 http://www.teachingtimes.com/articles/functional-skills.htm
 https://web.archive.org/web/20120312150329/http://www.usethekey.org.uk/curriculum-and-learning/secondary-and-further/14-19/information-on-functional-skill-sets

Educational qualifications in England